A mailroom (US) or post room (UK) is a room in which incoming and outgoing mail is processed and sorted. Mailrooms are commonly found in schools, offices, apartment buildings, and the generic post office. A person who works in a mailroom is known as a mailroom clerk or mailboy and the head person (sometimes the only person) is called the postmaster. The mailroom is responsible for a company's incoming and outgoing mail. A mailroom clerk prepares outgoing mail and packages prior to their being sent out via the post office or other carrier. 

In a large organization, the mailroom is the central hub of the internal mail system and the interface with external mail.  The postmaster manages the department, clerks assist them and mailboys deliver mail for other employees in different departments using a mail cart or a trolley doing regular rounds throughout the day.  Sometimes the mailboys will trolley sort using the departmental slots on the trolley to reduce work at the central hub and to speed internal mail.

See also

Digital mailroom
Mail services center
Internal mail

References

Office work
Postal systems
Rooms
Communication